The non-marine mollusks of Canada are a part of the molluscan fauna of Canada (wildlife of Canada). A number of species of non-marine mollusks are found in the wild in Canada.

Freshwater gastropods

Valvatidae
 Valvata lewisi Currier, 1868
 Valvata lewisi lewisi
 Valvata sincera sincera
 Valvata tricarinata Say, 1817

Lymnaeidae
 Bulimnea megasoma (Say, 1824)
 Fossaria dalli (F. C. Baker, 1907)
 Fossaria galbana (Say, 1825)
 Fossaria modicella (Say, 1825)
 Lymnaea stagnalis (Linnaeus, 1758)
 Lymnaea stagnalis appressa (Say, 1821)
 Stagnicola caperata Say 1829
 Stagnicola catascopium catascopium
 Stagnicola elodes (Say, 1821)
 Stagnicola exilis (Lea, 1834)
 Stagnicola palustris (O. F. Müller, 1774)

Physidae
 Aplexa elongata (Say 1821)
 Aplexa hypnorum (Linnaeus, 1758)
 Physa skinneri Taylor, 1954
 Physella gyrina (Say, 1821)

Planorbidae
 Ferrissia fragilis (Tryon, 1863)
 Ferrissia parallela (Haldeman, 1841)
 Ferrissia rivularis (Say, 1817)
 Gyraulus circumstriatus (Tryon, 1866)
 Gyraulus crista (Linnaeus, 1758)
 Gyraulus deflectus (Say, 1824)
 Gyraulus parvus (Say, 1817)
 Helisoma anceps anceps
 Helisoma antrosa (Conrad, 1834)
 Helisoma campanulata (Say, 1821)
 Helisoma trivolvis (Say, 1817)
 Menetus opercularis (Gould, 1847)
 Planorbella binneyi (Tryon, 1867)
 Planorbella pilsbryi infracarinatum (F.C. Baker, 1932)
 Planorbella subcrenata (Carpenter, 1857)
 Planorbella campanulata (Say, 1821)
 Planorbula armigera (Say, 1821)
 Planorbula campestris (Dawson, 1875)
 Promenetus exacuous (Say, 1821)
 Promenetus exacuous exacuous
 Promenetus exacuous megas (Dall, 1905)
 Promenetus umbilicatellus (Cockerell, 1887)

Land gastropods

Ellobiidae
 Carychium exiguum (Say, 1822)
 Carychium exile H. C. Lea, 1842
 Carychium minimum O.F. Müller, 1774

Succineidae
 Mediappendix vermeta (Say, 1829)
 Novisuccinea ovalis (Say, 1817)
 Oxyloma retusum (I. Lea, 1834)

Cochlicopidae
 Cochlicopa lubrica (Müller, 1774)

Lauriidae
 Lauria cylindracea (da Costa, 1778)

Pupillidae
 Pupilla blandii Morse, 1865
 Pupilla hudsonianum Nekola & Coles in Nekola, Coles & Horsák, 2015
 Pupilla muscorum (Linnaeus, 1758)
 Pupoides albilabris (C.B. Adams, 1841)

Strobilopsidae
 Strobilops labyrinthicus (Say, 1817)

Valloniidae
 Planogyra clappi Pilsbry, 1898
 Vallonia costata (Müller, 1774)
 Vallonia excentrica Sterki, 1893
 Vallonia gracilicosta Reinhardt, 1883
 Vallonia pulchella (Müller, 1774)
 Zoogenetes harpa (Say, 1824)

Chondrinidae
 Columella columella (G. von Martens, 1830)
 Columella edentula (Draparnaud, 1805)

Vertiginidae
 Vertigo arthuri E. von Martens, 1882
 Vertigo bollesiana Morse, 1865
 Vertigo columbiana Pilsbry and Vanatta, 1900
 Vertigo cristata Sterki in Pilsbry, 1919
 Vertigo elatior Sterki, 1894
 Vertigo genesii (Gredler, 1856)
 Vertigo gouldii A. Binney, 1843
 Vertigo hannai Pilsbry, 1919
 Vertigo modesta (Say, 1824)
 Vertigo oughtoni Pilsbry, 1948

Ferussaciidae
 Cecilioides acicula (O.F. Müller, 1774)

Gastrocoptidae
 Gastrocopta contracta (Say, 1822)
 Gastrocopta pentodon (Say, 1822)
 Gastrocopta similis (Sterki, 1909)
 Gastrocopta tappaniana (C.B. Adams, 1841)

Punctidae
 Punctum minutissimum (I. Lea, 1841)
 Punctum randolphii Dall, 1895

Discidae
 Anguispira alternata (Say, 1816)
 Anguispira kochi (L. Pfeiffer, 1846)
 Discus catskillensis (Pilsbry, 1896)
 Discus shimekii (Pilsbry, 1890)
 Discus whitneyi (Newcomb, 1864)

Helicodiscidae
 Helicodiscus parallelus (Say, 1821)

Oreohelicidae
 Oreohelix subrudis (Reeve, 1854)

Gastrodontidae
 Aegopinella nitidula (Draparnaud, 1805)
 Nesovitrea binneyana (Morse, 1864)
 Nesovitrea electrina (Gould, 1841)
 Striatura exigua (Stimpson, 1850)
 Striatura ferrea (Morse, 1864)
 Striatura milium (Morse, 1859)
 Striatura pugetensis Dall, 1895
 Zonitoides arboreus (Say, 1817)
 Zonitoides nitidus (Müller, 1774)

Haplotrematidae
 Ancotrema hybridum Ancey, 1888
 Haplotrema concavum (Say, 1821)
 Haplotrema vancouverense I. Lea, 1839

Euconulidae
 Euconulus fulvus (Müller, 1774)
 Euconulus polygyratus (Pilsbry, 1899)
 Guppya sterkii (Dall, 1888)

Oxychilidae
 Oxychilus alliarius J.S. Miller, 1822
 Oxychilus cellarius (O.F. Müller, 1774)
 Oxychilus draparnaudi (Beck, 1837)

Pristilomatidae
 Paravitrea multidentata (A. Binney, 1841)
 Pristiloma lansingi Bland, 1875
 Pristiloma stearnsii Bland,1875
 Vitrea contracta (Westerlund, 1870)

Limacidae
 Limax maximus Linnaeus, 1758

Agriolimacidae
 Deroceras laeve (Müller, 1774)
 Deroceras panormitanum (Lessona and Pollonera, 1882)
 Deroceras reticulatum (Müller, 1774)

Polygyridae
 Cryptomastix germana Gould in A. Binney, 1851
 Inflectarius inflectus (Say, 1821)
 Neohelix albolabris (Say, 1817)
 Neohelix dentifera (A. Binney, 1837)
 Patera appressa (Say, 1821)
 Vespericola columbianus I. Lea 1839
 Xolotrema denotatum (A. Férussac, 1821)

Boettgerillidae
 Boettgerilla pallens Simroth, 1912

Vitrinidae
 Vitrina angelicae Beck, 1837

Arionidae
 Ariolimax columbianus Gould in A. Binney, 1851
 Arion ater (Linnaeus, 1758)
 Arion distinctus Mabille, 1868
 Arion hortensis (Férussac, 1819)
 Arion rufus Linnaeus, 1758
 Arion subfuscus Draparnaud,1805
 Hemphillia glandulosa Bland and W.G. Binney, 1872
 Prophysaon andersonii (J.G. Cooper, 1872)
 Prophysaon coeruleum Cockerell, 1890
 Prophysaon foliolatum Gould in A. Binney, 1851
 Prophysaon vanattae Pilsbry,1948
 Staala gwaii Ovaska, Chichester & Sopuck, 2010

Geomitridae
 Xerolenta obvia (Menke, 1828)

Helicidae
 Cepaea nemoralis (Linnaeus, 1758)

Freshwater bivalves

See also

 List of marine molluscs of Canada
 List of non-marine molluscs of the United States

References

Molluscs
Canada
Canada